Mabesekwa is a village in Central District of Botswana. The village is located 60 km west of Francistown, and it has a primary school. The population was 886 in 2001 census.

References

Populated places in Central District (Botswana)
Villages in Botswana